Bruce Thompson (born November 13, 1951) is an American wrestler. He competed in the men's Greco-Roman 52 kg at the 1976 Summer Olympics.

References

1951 births
Living people
American male sport wrestlers
Olympic wrestlers of the United States
Wrestlers at the 1976 Summer Olympics
People from Morris, Minnesota
Pan American Games medalists in wrestling
Pan American Games gold medalists for the United States
Wrestlers at the 1975 Pan American Games
Wrestlers at the 1979 Pan American Games
Medalists at the 1975 Pan American Games
Medalists at the 1979 Pan American Games